Rakovica is a village in central-eastern Bosnia and Herzegovina, located west of Ilidža and Sarajevo on the local road towards Kiseljak. The village is located in the municipality of Ilidža.

Ernst von Mansfeld, a well-known mercenary general of the Thirty Years' War, died at Rakovica in 1626, while trying to reach Venice.

Demographics 
According to the 2013 census, its population was 1,836.

References

Populated places in Ilidža